The Sauk River is a tributary of the Skagit River, approximately  long, in northwestern Washington in the United States. It drains an area of the high Cascade Range in the watershed of Puget Sound north of Seattle. The river is a popular destination for fly fishing. It is a National Wild and Scenic River.

Its two forks rise in the Cascades in eastern Snohomish County, in the Glacier Peak Wilderness and join to form the mainstem Sauk River at Bedal. From there the river flows northwest from there through a remote section of the Mount Baker-Snoqualmie National Forest to Darrington, then north to join the Skagit River from the south at Rockport. Another important tributary is Clear Creek, which joins the Sauk just above Darrington.

At Darrington the Sauk River comes so close to the head of the North Fork Stillaguamish River that boats used to portage across the divide.

The name "Sauk" comes from the Sah-kee-ma-hu (Sauk-Suiattle tribe), a group related to the Skagit tribes, not from the Sauk tribe of the Midwestern U.S.

South Fork 

The South Fork Sauk River's headwaters flow from a glacier on the northwest side of Columbia Peak. The river flows generally northwest through Seventysix Gulch to Monte Cristo, where it is joined by Glacier Creek. The South Fork continues to flow northwest until it is joined by Weden Creek, where it turns north. It flows just east of Barlow Pass, after which it is paralleled by the Mountain Loop Highway. After several miles the river enters Monte Cristo Lake. A number of camping sites are located along the South Fork Sauk River north of Monte Cristo Lake. Near Bedal Campground the South Fork converges with the North Fork to form the mainstem Sauk River.

A remarkably short and low divide, Barlow Pass, separates the South Fork Sauk River from Palmer Creek, a headwater tributary of the South Fork Stillaguamish River. The unusual geography, orientation, and size of these rivers and their valleys suggests that during the Pleistocene era the Sauk River flowed west through Barlow Pass into what it now the Stillaguamish valley.

Tributaries
 Glacier Creek: Joins the South Fork at Monte Cristo.
 Elliot Creek: Joins just downstream from the outlet of Monte Cristo Lake.

North Fork 

The North Fork, the larger of the two forks, starts at the outlet of a small, unnamed lake opposite to Blue Lake near Johnson Mountain. It flows generally northwest for most of its length. Shortly below it also drops over smaller Lower North Fork Falls. The North Fork converges with the South Fork near Bedal Campground, forming the mainstem Sauk River.

According to Fred Beckey the source of the North Fork could be equally considered to be its tributary Cadet Creek, which joins the North Fork via Sloan Creek.

Tributaries
 Cadet Creek: Flows from the northeast side of Monte Cristo Peak.
 Cougar Creek: Flows from Cougar Lake on the east side of Bedal Peak.

History

In 1890 prospectors exploring north from the Skykomish River basin made discoveries leading to the mining boom at Monte Cristo near the source of the North Fork Sauk River. The difficulty of access from the south led to the 1891 construction of a narrow wagon road along the Sauk River. The Sauk wagon road ran from Sauk City on the Skagit River to the mines at Monte Cristo. A key stop on this road was the trading post at Orient, at the forks of the Sauk River. Today this area is known as Bedal. Today the Mountain Loop Highway follows part of the Sauk River more or less along the route of the old wagon road.

See also 
 List of rivers in Washington

References 

Rivers of Washington (state)
North Cascades of Washington (state)
Rivers of Skagit County, Washington
Rivers of Snohomish County, Washington
Wild and Scenic Rivers of the United States